Bièvres may refer to the following places in France:

 Bièvres, Aisne, a commune in the department of Aisne
 Bièvres, Ardennes, a commune in the department of Ardennes
 Bièvres, Essonne, a commune in the department of Essonne